Jean-René Germanier (born 12 December 1958) is a Swiss politician. He was first elected to the National Council for the canton of Valais. He was subsequently elected President of the National Council in 2010.

Germanier is an oenologist and winemaker. He lives in Vétroz and is father of a child. In the Swiss army, he held the rank of corporal.

References

Living people
1958 births
FDP.The Liberals politicians
Members of the National Council (Switzerland)
Presidents of the National Council (Switzerland)
Canton of Valais politicians